Magnus Norman was the defending champion, but did not compete this year.

Qualifier Fernando González won the first title of his career by defeating his compatriot Nicolás Massú 6–2, 6–3 in the final.

Seeds
A champion seed is indicated in bold text while text in italics indicates the round in which that seed was eliminated.

  Andrew Ilie (first round)
  Jan-Michael Gambill (first round)
  Gianluca Pozzi (quarterfinals)
  Jason Stoltenberg (second round)
  Paul Goldstein (second round)
  Nicolás Massú (final)
  André Sá (first round)
  Justin Gimelstob (first round)

Draw

Qualifying

Qualifying seeds

Qualifiers

Qualifying draw

First qualifier

Second qualifier

Third qualifier

Fourth qualifier

References

External links
 Official results archive (ATP)
 Official results archive (ITF)

Singles